Japanese Braille is the braille script of the Japanese language. It is based on the original braille script, though the connection is tenuous. It transcribes Japanese more or less as it would be written in the hiragana or katakana syllabaries, without any provision for writing kanji.

Japanese Braille is a vowel-based abugida. That is, the glyphs are syllabic, but unlike kana they contain separate symbols for consonant and vowel, and the vowel takes primacy. The vowels are written in the upper left corner (dots 1, 2, 4) and may be used alone. The consonants are written in the lower right corner (dots 3, 5, 6) and cannot occur alone. However, the semivowel y is indicated by dot 4, one of the vowel dots, and the vowel combination is dropped to the bottom of the cell. When this dot is written in isolation, it indicates that the following syllable has a medial y, as in mya. Syllables beginning with w are indicated by dropping the vowel dots to the bottom of the cell without additional consonant dots.

Braille for kana

In Japanese Braille, bare vowels are assigned to braille patterns that occupy the upper-left half of the cell (dots 1-2-4) in numerical order: . The cells representing other kana have no apparent connection to international values or numerical order. Common punctuation marks tend to follow standard international values, with several doing double-duty with the w- series of kana braille. Beyond the bare vowels, all other kana use the vowel series, called dan, with each gyō (consonant series) represented either by adding specific dots, lowering the dot positions of the dan vowel patterns within the cell, or both.

The patterns for adding yōon to a mora can be added to the modifiers for dakuten and handakuten as a compound kana modifier, and the ya gyō braille series is based on the yōon dot pattern. The symbol for  syllabic "n" is based on its historical derivation from  mu.

Other symbols
In kana, a small tsu, called sokuon, is used to indicate that the following consonant is geminate, and in interjections as a glottal stop. In katakana only, a long vowel is indicated with a horizontal stroke called a chōon. This also looks like a half dash in braille:

The placement of these blocks mirrors the equivalent kana: the sokuon indicates that the following consonant is geminate, whereas the chōon indicates that the preceding vowel is long.

In kana, the voiced consonants g, z, d, b are derived from the voiceless consonants k, s, t, h by adding a diacritic called dakuten to the kana, as in  gi; in foreign words, vu is written by adding this to the vowel u. Similarly, p is derived from h by adding a small circle, handakuten. Two kana are fused into a single syllable by writing the second small, as in  kya from ki + ya; this is called yōon.

In Japanese Braille, the signs for these are prefixes. That is, the order is dakuten + ki for  gi. When more than one occurs in a single syllable, they are combined in a single prefix block, as the yōon-dakuten used for  gya.

The yōon prefix uses the dot that represents y in the blocks ya, yu, yo. When placed before ka, ku, ko, it produces kya, kyu, kyo. Likewise, the yōon-dakuten prefix before ka, ku, ko creates gya, gyu, gyo. And so on for the other consonants.

Unlike kana, which uses a subscript e, in braille the -ye in foreign borrowings is written with yōon and the kana from the e row: that is, kye, she, che, nye, hye, mye, rye, voiced gye, je, bye, and plosive pye are written with the yōon prefixes plus ke, se, te, ne, he, me, re. The syllable ye is written yōon plus e.

There is also a prefix for medial -w- called gōyōon. When combined with ka, it produces the obsolete syllable kwa. It may also be fused with the voicing prefix for gwa. For foreign borrowings, this extends to kwi, kwe, kwo and gwa, gwi, gwe, gwo. Gōyōon may also be combined with the vowels i, e, o for foreign wi, we, wo (now that the w in the original Japanese kana for wi, we, wo is silent); with ha, hi, he, ho for fa, fi, fe, fo and (when voiced) for va, vi, ve, vo; and with ta, chi, te, to for tsa, tsi, tse, tso. These two prefixes are identical to the question mark and full stop.

These all parallel usage in kana. However, there are additional conventions which are unique to braille. Yōon and yōon-dakuten are also added to chi and shi to write ti, di and si, zi found in foreign borrowings; similarly gōyōon and gōyōon-dakuten are added to tsu to write tu, du. This differs from the system used in kana, where the base syllables are te and to respectively, and a subscript vowel i or u is added.

In an assignment that is counter-intuitive in kana, yōon + handakuten is prefixed to tsu, yu, yo to produce tyu, fyu, fyo in foreign words, and voiced for dyu, vyu, vyo. The latter—yōon + dakuten + handakuten, is impossible in kana:

Orthography
Japanese Braille is written as print Japanese would be written in kana.  However, there are three discrepancies:
 In print, the ubiquitous grammatical particles wa and e have the historical spellings  ha and  he.  In braille, they are written as they are pronounced,  wa and  e.
Long ū is also written with a chōon rather than a u. (This is a common convention in katakana, but does not occur in hiragana.) Thus Tōkyō, sorted as Toukyou in dictionaries, is nonetheless written , and sansū is written .
 Spaces are used to separate words (though not clauses or sentences, where punctuation performs that function).  Thus  is spaced as in its romanization, though without separating particles from their nouns: Kyōwa asakara yoku harete iru.  Spaces are also placed between family and personal names, as in  Ishikawa Kuraji.  When writing in katakana, an interpunct  is used for this function in print, as in  Rui Buraiyu (Louis Braille).

Punctuation

Besides the punctuation of Japanese, braille also has symbols to indicate that the following characters are digits or the Latin alphabet.

As noted above, the space is used between words and also where an interpunct would be used when names are written in katakana. There are several additional punctuation marks.

Formatting 

Western letters and digits are indicated as follows:

An additional sign indicates that the following characters are specifically English words and not just in the Latin alphabet.

Words immediately follow numbers, unless they begin with a vowel or with r-. Because the syllables a i u e o and ra ri ru re ro are homographic with the digits 0–9, a hyphen is inserted to separate them.

Kanji
There are both a six dot system, tenkanji and an eight-dot extension of Japanese Braille kantenji, that have been devised to transcribe kanji.

Notes and references

External links

The Braille Authority of Japan – the standard-setting body for braille notation in Japan
World Blind Union

Braille
Innovative braille scripts